Doomed for Live – Reunion 2002 is the second live album by Swedish doom metal band Candlemass. It was recorded at Stockholm's Klubben on 31 August 2002.

Track listing

Disc one
All songs by Leif Edling
"Mirror Mirror" – 5:51 	
"Bewitched" – 4:33 	
"Dark Are the Veils of Death" – 4:04 	
"Demons Gate" – 9:23 	
"Under the Oak" – 6:17 	
"At the Gallows End" – 5:33 	
"Samarithan" – 5:15 	
"Dark Reflections" – 4:43 	
"Mourner's Lament" – 4:46 	
"Black Stone Wielder" – 2:54

Disc two
"The Well of Souls" – 8:53 	
"A Sorcerer's Pledge" – 10:24 	
"Bearer of Pain" – 4:26 	
"Ancient Dreams" – 0:30 	
"Somewhere in Nowhere" – 4:32 	
"Solitude" – 7:39 	
"Crystal Ball" – 7:22

Personnel
Candlemass
 Messiah Marcolin - vocals
 Lars Johansson - lead guitar
 Mats Björkman - rhythm guitar
 Leif Edling - bass guitar, producer, mixing
 Jan Lindh - drums

Production
Nenne Zetterberg - producer
Staffan Schöijer, Ulf Östling - engineers
Johan Östling - assistant engineer
Uffe Östling - mixing
Janne Waldenmark, Pontus Norgren - ProTools fixes
Micke Lind - mastering

References

Candlemass (band) albums
2003 live albums